Amphithalea is a genus of flowering plants in the family Fabaceae. It belongs to the subfamily Faboideae.

Species
Amphithalea comprises the following species:

 Amphithalea alba Granby
 Amphithalea axillaris Granby
 Amphithalea biovulata (Bolus) Granby

 Amphithalea bodkinii Dummer
 Amphithalea bowiei (Benth.) A. L. Schutte
 Amphithalea bullata (Benth.) A. L. Schutte
 Amphithalea cedarbergensis (Granby) A. L. Schutte
 Amphithalea ciliaris Eckl. & Zeyh.
 Amphithalea concava Granby
 Amphithalea cuneifolia Eckl. & Zeyh.
 Amphithalea cymbifolia (C. A. Sm.) A. L. Schutte
 Amphithalea dahlgrenii (Granby) A. L. Schutte

 Amphithalea ericifolia (L.) Eckl. & Zeyh.
 Amphithalea esterhuyseniae (Granby) A. L. Schutte
 Amphithalea flava (Granby) A. L. Schutte
 Amphithalea fourcadei Compton
 Amphithalea imbricata (L.) Druce
 Amphithalea intermedia Eckl. & Zeyh.
 Amphithalea micrantha (E. Mey.) Walp.
 Amphithalea minima (Granby) A. L. Schutte
 Amphithalea monticola A. L. Schutte
 Amphithalea muirii (Granby) A. L. Schutte
 Amphithalea muraltioides (Benth.) A. L. Schutte
 Amphithalea obtusiloba (Granby) A. L. Schutte
 Amphithalea oppositifolia L. Bolus
 Amphithalea pageae (L. Bolus) A. L. Schutte
 Amphithalea parvifolia (Thunb.) A. L. Schutte
 Amphithalea perplexa Eckl. & Zeyh.
 Amphithalea phylicoides Eckl. & Zeyh.

 Amphithalea purpurea (Granby) A. L. Schutte

 Amphithalea sericea Schltr.
 Amphithalea speciosa Schltr.
 Amphithalea spinosa (Harv.) A. L. Schutte
 Amphithalea stokoei L. Bolus
 Amphithalea tomentosa (Thunb.) Granby
 Amphithalea tortilis (E. Mey.) Steud.
 Amphithalea villosa Schltr.
 Amphithalea violacea (E. Mey.) Benth.
 Amphithalea virgata Eckl. & Zeyh.
 Amphithalea vlokii (A. L. Schutte & B.-E. van Wyk) A. L. Schutte
 Amphithalea williamsonii Harv.

References

Podalyrieae
Fabaceae genera